James Nichols may refer to:

James D. Nichols (1928–2003), American jockey
James Nichols, convicted for the 2007 murder of Cha Vang in Wisconsin
James P. Nichols, recording industry producer and engineer
James Nichols (printer) (1785–1861), English printer and theological writer
James Edward Nichols (1902–1972), Welsh geneticist
James Nichols (1954–2017), brother of Terry Nichols, Oklahoma City Bombing accomplice

See also
James Nicholls (disambiguation)
Jim Nickalls (1934–2016), English football centre-half for Darlington